Boris Vladimirovich Gnedenko (January 1, 1912 – December 27, 1995) was a Soviet Ukrainian mathematician and a student of Andrey Kolmogorov. He was born in Simbirsk (now Ulyanovsk), Russia, and died in Moscow. He is perhaps best known for his work with Kolmogorov, and his contributions to the study of probability theory, particularly extreme value theory, with such results as the Fisher–Tippett–Gnedenko theorem. Gnedenko was appointed as Head of the Physics, Mathematics and Chemistry Section of the Ukrainian Academy of Sciences in 1949, and became Director of the NASU Institute of Mathematics in 1955.

Gnedenko was a leading member of the Russian school of probability theory and statistics. He also worked on applications of statistics to reliability and quality control in manufacturing. He wrote a history of mathematics in Russia (published 1946) and with O. B. Sheynin the section on the history of probability theory in the history of mathematics by Kolmogorov and Adolph P. Yushkevich (published 1992). In 1958 he was a plenary speaker at the International Congress of Mathematicians in Edinburgh with a talk entitled "Limit theorems of probability theory".

Books 
 
 with A. N. Kolmogorov: 
 with A. Ya. Khinchin: 
 
 with Yu. K. Belyayev and A. D. Solovyev: 
 with I. N. Kovalenko:

References

External links 

1912 births
1995 deaths
People from Ulyanovsk
People from Simbirsky Uyezd
Members of the National Academy of Sciences of Ukraine
NASU Institute of Mathematics
Soviet mathematicians
Recipients of the Order of Friendship of Peoples
Recipients of the Order of the Red Banner of Labour
Recipients of the USSR State Prize
Historians of mathematics
Probability theorists
Burials at Kuntsevo Cemetery